Nocebo is a 2022 Filipino-Irish psychological thriller film directed by Lorcan Finnegan from a screenplay by Garret Shanley. The film stars Eva Green, Mark Strong, Chai Fonacier, Billie Gadsdon, Cathy Belton and Anthony Falcon.

Plot
Christine (Eva Green), is a successful English childrenswear designer. At work, she is informed of a disaster via a call although it is not revealed what is said to her. While she is in shock, a tick-infested dog manifests and approaches her, shaking itself so violently that a number of ticks are spread onto Christine before vanishing. One tick remains and attaches to the nape of her neck. 

Eight months later, Christine is debilitated by a mysterious illness that has crippled her work and family life. After returning home from a failed pitch to her designer firm, Tykie Couture, Christine is startled by a spoon falling to the floor at the same time a woman named Diana (Chai Fonacier), who claims to be the caregiver that Christine has hired but seemingly forgot about - arrives at her door.  Christine's husband, Felix, and daughter, Bobs, are both distrustful of Diana, a stranger now suddenly living with their family. Bobs demands that  Diana call her by her full name, Roberta, as they are not friends. Meanwhile, Christine and Felix argue about Diana, which she overhears from the vents in her room. 

Diana unpacks her suitcase, revealing a collection of relics and folk magic ingredients. She uses a matchbox to summon and capture the tick that bit Christine, then assembles an altar in her bedroom fireplace. Diana uses the fireplace ashes in a ritual to commune with the unseen spirit of a child. 

With Christine's condition worsening, Diana volunteers to make dinner for the family, cooking a Visayan dish called humba, sprinkling into it a concoction of herbs previously shown at her altar. During dinner Christine gets sudden pains in her arms after reaching for a glass, and Diana comes to her aid, insisting she can "make it go away". Diana cures Christine's pain by hovering her hands over the painful area, then tickling her until the pain is gone.

Feeling better after the treatment, Christine drives Bobs to school with Diana in the car with them to learn the way. However, Christine experiences sudden amnesia and forgets the route; Diana then suggests that they all walk instead, and asks Bobs to lead the way. As Christine laments over her illness, Diana offers to get rid of it for her, explaining that she posesses some therapeutic power that could help cure Christine. 

Diana recounts the story of when she was a little girl. One night during a rainstorm, an old woman, who was very sick, stopped by her house to seek shelter. While Diana's parents were preparing some food and medicine to soothe the visitor's condition, it occurred to her that the old woman was an Ongo, and her power needed transfer to another upon her death. As Diana approached her, a black featherless chick exited the woman's mouth and entered Diana's. Since then, Diana inherited supernatural therapeutic powers that enabled her to heal all types of illnesses; however, while she was often called to heal people in her Filipino community, her ability also drove friends and acquaintances away because they regarded her as a witch. 

Regardless of her skepticism, Christine begins allowing Diana to treat her; the results prove to be successful as Christine becomes healthier and livelier each day. When Christine discovers her medications are missing she initially confronts Diana about it, but becomes confused when Diana tells her that she is suffering from memory loss again, and it was Christine herself who disposed of the drugs.

Although things have improved tremendously, Felix remains dubious of Diana's method and motives. Late one night, he makes a decision to speak directly with Diana in her room and order her to stay away from his wife because her illness is psychosomatic from past guilt. Diana, however, refuses and she suggests that Felix leave her bedroom, adding ominously that he should be careful with the stairs. As Felix gets out of her room and is about to walk down the stairs, he is almost attacked by Bobs's pet bird that has somehow escaped from the cage and is flying in his direction. Panicked, he hits the bird, accidentally killing it. 

The next day, Bobs buries the dead bird in the garden with Diana by her side. The two have begun to form a bond: Bobs allows Diana to refer to her as "Bobs" instead of Roberta, and Diana tells Bobs that she will be her friend and never leave her. Felix senses that Diana is somehow responsible for the incident and fears she is driving a wedge between him and his family. Felix begins searching Diana's room and discovers the altar and Christine's  drugs hidden under Diana's bed. Felix and Christine confront Diana and she is promptly fired for lying. Before departing, Diana says goodbye to Bobs and asks her to do her a favor.

The following day, Bobs lies to Christine and tells her Felix hid the drugs in his car and blamed Diana. Christine fights with Felix over the betrayal, and he agrees to go sleep upstairs in the room previously used by Diana.  At the top of the staircase he is attacked by a bird that appears to be Bobs's deceased pet, and is injured in the fall. Felix is taken to recover at the hospital which allows Diana an excuse to return and care for a further ailing Christine.

Flashbacks show Diana’s life in the Philippines when she lived happily with her husband and daughter until their village was raided by insurgents, forcing them to flee to Cebu City. Diana ultimately is forced to work at a sweatshop, and takes her daughter with her. It is revealed that the sweatshop was used by Christine to produce her Tykie Couture clothing line, and on one particular visit to the shop she advised the managers to overwork the employees and to lock the only exit to make sure no thefts occurred.

In the present, Diana performs a final ritual with Christine under the expectation that she will be cured. Diana reveals that she isn't curing Christine, but rather forcing her to face her judgement with a hex. Christine then experiences visions of the sweatshop and ultimately the tragedy that triggered her illness: After her visit to the shop, a fire broke out while Diana was getting coconut water for her daughter. Unable to escape due to the locked door, the employees and  Diana's daughter perish. Outside in the aftermath of the fire, Diana uses her powers as an Ongo to send a spectre of the infected street dog to Christine, and hex her with the illness. Christine continues to experience the sensations of the fire as her skin starts to blister and burn.

Felix returns home from the hospital only to find Christine's body seated at her sewing machine burnt down to her ankles, save for her lucky red shoes. Elsewhere, Diana visits Bobs for the last time and instructs her to wait in the garden. Diana the climbs to the roof and jumps to her death in front of Bobs so that the Ongo power can transfer into her. Just as before with the old woman, a black bird emerges from Diana's mouth and enters Bobs's.

The film ends with Bobs alone in the woods collecting herbs while being watched over from afar by the spectre of Diana.

Cast
 Eva Green as Christine
 Mark Strong as Felix
 Chai Fonacier as Diana
 Billie Gadsdon as Bobs
 Cathy Belton as Liz
 Anthony Falcon as Jomar

Production
Principal photography began on February 1, 2021, in Dublin, Ireland.

Music
The film's ending track featured the Filipino song Pugon (2016) by The General Strike, which references the 2015 Kentex slipper factory fire, the third worst fire incident in the Philippines, to which the film's subplot is loosely based from. The end credits display the statement "JUSTICE FOR ALL KENTEX FIRE VICTIMS" after mentioning the song's credits.

Reception

References

External links
 

Irish thriller films
Philippine psychological thriller films
Shudder (streaming service) original programming